A tavil or thavil is a barrel-shaped percussion instrument from Tamil Nadu.

Tavil may also refer to:

 Tavil, East Azerbaijan, Iran
 Tavil, Khuzestan, Iran
 Tavil, Chenaran, Razavi Khorasan Province, Iran
 Tavil, Quchan, Razavi Khorasan Province, Iran

See also

Tawil (disambiguation)